International College Spain is an international school in La Moraleja, Alcobendas, Community of Madrid, Spain.

It is the only school in the Madrid metropolitan area to offer the full International Baccalaureate Programme in English. International College Spain is a day school, offering both primary and secondary education to children from 3 to 18 years of age within an international community of over 70 different nationalities.

History

International College Spain was founded by Manouchehr Farhangi in 1980. It is the first school in Spain to join Nord Anglia Education Group, a global family of 70+ international schools in 31 countries.

Curriculum

International College Spain, authorized by the International Baccalaureate Organization (IBO) follows the complete IB Curriculum from PYP, to MYP and, finally, the IB Diploma program. The language of instruction in all classes is English, except for foreign language classes which are taught in their corresponding languages.

Accreditations and Associations

International College Spain is accredited by the International Baccalaureate Organization (IBO), Council of International Schools (CIS), New England Association of Schools and Colleges (NEASC). It is also a member of the Mediterranean Association of International Schools (MAIS) .

References

International schools in the Community of Madrid
International schools in Spain
International Baccalaureate schools in Spain
Schools in Alcobendas
Educational institutions established in 1980
Nord Anglia Education